Vladimir Mikhailovich Blok (7 November 1932, Moscow – 28 August 1996, Moscow) was a Russian musicologist, composer and orchestrator of the works of Prokofiev, of Udmurt ethnicity.

V.M. Blok is to be distinguished from the Russian theatre critic Vladimir Borisovich Blok (b. 22 June 1918)

Completions
 completion of the Prokofiev Andante for solo cello.
 orchestration of the Prokofiev Concertino, commissioned by Steven Isserlis

Publications
 Prokofiev's works for cello - Виолончельное творчество Прокофьева. Muzika, 1973.
 Sergei Prokofiev: materials articles interviews (Russian edition: Сергей Прокофьев: материалы, статьи, интервью). Moscow: Progress Publishers, 1978.

Own compositions
 Quartet, rec. Barcelona Quartet 2004

References

See also
entry in Udmurt Wikipedia

1996 deaths
Russian composers
Russian male composers
1932 births
Russian musicologists
Udmurt people
20th-century composers
20th-century musicologists
20th-century Russian male musicians